Rozanne Felicity Hastings Colchester (née Medhurst, 10 November 1922 – 17 November 2016) worked in British intelligence in the 1940s.

Early life
She met Mussolini and Hitler before the Second World War.

Career 
In 1941 she joined Bletchley Park as a decoder. Her father (Charles Medhurst), himself involved in intelligence, recruited her. She spoke Italian which led to her joining the RAF section.  Following a successful interview she was immediately taken on and completed two days' training delivered by Joe Hooper.

Colchester entered one of “Britain’s most secret organisations”, Bletchley Park. The majority of Bletchley Park “was based on the forensic decrypting and ordering of thousands of enemies messages”. Colchester played a massive role in the "decrypting and ordering"of the enemy's incoming messages, along with many other women working alongside Colchester at Bletchley Park. Due to Colchester’s past experience of decoding skills, this helped in uncovering many of the “general patterns of communications and confirmed logistical information”.
During Colchester’s interview with The Guardian, she mentions how the conditions during her time at Bletchley Park were “very hard”, adding to this Colchester describes the work as “monotonous, sluggish work”, but states how gradually she began to understand the coding more and more as time went on.

After the war, she worked for the Secret Intelligence Service in an undisclosed role. She served in Cairo and Istanbul where she helped investigate the double agent Kim Philby.

Personal life
In 1946, she married Halsey Sparrowe Colchester, who became vicar of Great Tew and Little Tew, Oxfordshire, having previously been a Foreign Office diplomat and head of personnel at MI6; they had four sons and a daughter.

References

1922 births
2016 deaths
Bletchley Park people
Bletchley Park women
GCHQ cryptographers
Secret Intelligence Service personnel